Y Speak was a youth-oriented debate show that discusses on Philippine issues. Now on its seventh year, Studio 23's flagship show Y Speak is hosted by Bianca Gonzalez which airs every Saturday.

To date, it is one of Studio 23's most awarded local shows. Aside from the CMMA victory as Best TV Talk Show, it is also a recipient of the UST Students' Choice Award for Best Public Affairs Talk Show, the Gandingan (UPLB Students' Choice Award) for Best Panel Discussion Show, the Anak TV Seal, and endorsements from the Department of Education and the National Youth Commission.

Hosts

Main host
Bianca Gonzalez
Karen Davila
Ryan Agoncillo

Y Speak Squad
Mo Twister
Vince Liwanag
Patricia Evangelista
Sam Concepcion
JC Cuadrado
Ricci Chan 
Mikee Lee
Bettina Carlos
Bam Aquino
Enchong Dee

Guest host
Jake Cuenca
Maja Salvador 
Gerald Anderson
Billy Crawford

Production crew
Y Speak is produced by Studio 23, headed by 
Supervising Producer and Headwriter:Mori Rodriguez, 
Executive Producer: Karen Almeida-Pedrealba & Bianca Gonzales
Co-Headwriter: Mae Manalac 
Writers: Xavier Gravides, Janice O'Hara, Hanah Faraon
Associate Producer: Yog Macan.

Awards and recognitions
Winner, Best Public Affairs Program - KBP Golden Dove Awards 2007 & 2010
Winner, Best TV Talk Show - Catholic Mass Media Awards 2006
Winner, Ryan Agoncillo, Best Public Affairs Program Host - KBP Golden Dove Awards 2005
Winner, Best Public Affairs Talk Show - UST Students Choice Awards 2006
Winner, Best Panel Discussion Show - The Gandingan UPLB Students Choice Awards
Winner, Anak TV Seal Awards (2005-2007)
Special Award for Promoting Education - 2009 MTRCB TV Awards
Special Award - Department Of Education
Special Award - National Youth Commission
Nominee, Best Celebrity Talk Show - PMPC Star Awards for Television (2000-2007)
Nominee, Best Public Affairs Program - KBP Golden Dove Awards (2000-2006)
Nominee, Bianca Gonzalez, Best Public Affairs Program Host - KBP Golden Dove Awards 2005

Overview
Y Speak was originally broadcast on ABS-CBN hosted by Ryan Agoncillo and Karen Davila with Bianca as the segment host in 2004. The debate show later moved to Studio 23 in 2005.

See also
List of programs aired by Studio 23
Studio 23 (now S+A)

Studio 23 original programming
Philippine television talk shows
2003 Philippine television series debuts
2010 Philippine television series endings
Debate television series
ABS-CBN original programming
Filipino-language television shows